is a Japanese voice actress from Saitama Prefecture. She is affiliated with VIMS.

Personal life
She passed her audition for the first role in the TV anime Erased.

Filmography

TV anime

ONA
The Way of the Househusband (2021), Kid at Mall
Kakegurui Twin (2022), Yukimi Togakushi

OVA
Girls und Panzer: This is the Real Anzio Battle! (2014), Pepperoni
Nisekoi (2014), Honda
Prison School (2016), Anzu Yokoyama
Seisei Suru Hodo, Aishiteru (2017), Mia Kurihara
Mobile Suit Gundam: The Witch from Mercury Prologue (2022), Wendy Olent

Anime films
Harmonie (2014), Ryōko
Kuro no Su - Chronus (2014), Hazuki Horiuchi
Girls und Panzer der Film (2015), Pepperoni, Kubota
Monster Strike The Movie (2016), Shirō Amakusa
Girls und Panzer das Finale (2017), Murakami
Blackfox (2019), Melissa
Her Blue Sky (2019), Masatsugu Nakamura
High School Fleet: The Movie (2020), Hideko Yamashita
Princess Principal: Crown Handler (2021), Dorothy
Blue Thermal (2022), Ayako Maki

Mobile game
Tokyo 7th Sisters (2014–present), Chacha Ootori
Azur Lane (2017), IJN Ayanami, HMS Rodney
Grand Chase: Dimensional Chaser (2018), Lulu
Girls' Frontline (2018), K3 & Minebea PM-9
Arknights (2019), Deepcolor, Scavenger
A Certain Magical Index: Imaginary Fest (2019), Leivinia Birdway
Dragalia Lost (2021), Sandalphon

Web Anime
Hikari: Kariya o Tsunagu Monogatari (2016), Honomi
Tawawa on Monday (2016), School Nurse, Announcement
Nanbaka (2017), KAGU-8, Mao Nimaijita

Video games

Web Comic
VOMIC Ansatsu Kyōshitsu, Kaede Kayano

Dubbing
Alice Through the Looking Glass, Queen Elsemere (Hattie Morahan)
Bad Boys for Life, Kelly (Vanessa Hudgens)
Freaky, Millie Kessler (Kathryn Newton)
Godzilla: King of the Monsters, Young Madison (Lexi Rabe)
The Huntsman: Winter's War, Young Tull (Nana Agyeman-Bediako)
Mad Max: Fury Road (2019 THE CINEMA edition), The Splendid Angharad (Rosie Huntington-Whiteley)
Southpaw, Leila Hope (Oona Laurence)
Split, Marcia (Jessica Sula)
West Side Story, Graziella (Paloma Garcia-Lee)

References

External links
 Official agency profile 
 

Living people
Japanese video game actresses
Japanese voice actresses
Voice actresses from Saitama Prefecture
Year of birth missing (living people)
21st-century Japanese actresses